In computational geometry, a point  in a finite set of points  is said to be maximal or non-dominated if there is no other point  in  whose coordinates are all greater than or equal to the corresponding coordinates of .
The problem of finding all maximal points, sometimes called the problem of the maxima or maxima set problem, has been studied as a variant of the convex hull and orthogonal convex hull problems. It is equivalent to finding the Pareto frontier of a collection of points, and was called the floating-currency problem by Herbert Freeman based on an application involving comparing the relative wealth of individuals with different holdings of multiple currencies.

Two dimensions
For points in two dimensions, this problem can be solved in time  by an algorithm that performs the following steps:
Sort the points in one of the coordinate dimensions (the -coordinate, say)
For each point, in decreasing order by -coordinate, test whether its -coordinate is greater than the maximum -coordinate of any previously processed point. (For the first point, this is vacuously true). If it is, output the point as one of the maximal points, and remember its -coordinate as the greatest seen so far.

If the coordinates of the points are assumed to be integers, this can be sped up using integer sorting algorithms, to have the same asymptotic running time as the sorting algorithms.

Three dimensions
For points in three dimensions, it is again possible to find the maximal points in time  using an algorithm similar to the two-dimensional one that performs the following steps:
Sort the points in one of the coordinate dimensions (the -coordinate, say)
For each point, in decreasing order by -coordinate, test whether its projection onto the  plane is maximal among the set of projections of the set of points processed so far. If it is, output the point as one of the maximal points, and remember its -coordinate as the greatest seen so far.
This method reduces the problem of computing the maximal points of a static three-dimensional point set to one of maintaining the maximal points of a dynamic two-dimensional point set.
The two-dimensional subproblem can be solved efficiently by using a balanced binary search tree to maintain the set of maxima of a dynamic point set.
Using this data structure, it is possible to test whether a new point is dominated by the existing points, to find and remove the previously-undominated points that are dominated by a new point, and to add a new point to the set of maximal points, in logarithmic time per point.

For points with integer coordinates the first part of the algorithm, sorting the points, can again be sped up by integer sorting. After this reduction in the coordinate space, the problem of maintaining a dynamic two-dimensional set of maximal points may be solved by using a van Emde Boas tree in place of the balanced binary search tree.

Higher dimensions
In any dimension  the problem can be solved in time  by testing all pairs of points for whether one dominates another, and reporting as output the points that are not dominated. For point sets that are generated randomly, it is possible to solve the problem in linear time.

References

Computational geometry